7545 Smaklösa, provisional designation , is a stony background asteroid from the inner regions of the asteroid belt, approximately 4 kilometers in diameter. It was discovered on 28 July 1978, by Swedish astronomer Claes-Ingvar Lagerkvist at Mount Stromlo Observatory in Canberra, Australia. The asteroid was named for the Swedish band Smaklösa.

Orbit and classification 

Smaklösa orbits the Sun in the inner main-belt at a distance of 1.7–2.8 AU once every 3 years and 5 months (1,242 days). Its orbit has an eccentricity of 0.23 and an inclination of 7° with respect to the ecliptic. As no precoveries were taken, the asteroid's observation arc begins with its discovery in 1978.

Physical characteristics

Lightcurves 

In August 2012, a rotational lightcurve of Smaklösa was obtained at the Oakley Southern Sky Observatory in Coonabarabran, Australia. The photometric observation showed a well-defined rotation period of  hours with a brightness variation of 0.75 in magnitude.

Diameter and albedo 

According to the survey carried out by the NEOWISE mission of NASA's Wide-field Infrared Survey Explorer, Smaklösa measures 4.1 kilometers in diameter and its surface has an albedo of 0.24, while the Collaborative Asteroid Lightcurve Link assumes a standard albedo for stony asteroids of 0.20 and calculates a diameter of 4.3 kilometers.

Naming 

This minor planet was named after the Gotlandic music group Smaklösa. (Literally "Flavourless", but also "Tasteless" or "Tacky". The latter meaning is intended here as indicated by the name of their own record label "Tasteless Records").

The Swedish band gave a number of concerts on the island of Gotland. They are known for their cleverly phrased lyrics mixed with the local humor of the island. The discoverer of this minor planet has named it after the band, grateful for having attended their concerts in 1998, which are unforgettable to him. The official naming citation was published by the Minor Planet Center on 8 December 1998.

See also 
 List of Gotland-related asteroids

References

External links 
 Asteroid Lightcurve Database (LCDB), query form (info )
 Dictionary of Minor Planet Names, Google books
 Asteroids and comets rotation curves, CdR – Observatoire de Genève, Raoul Behrend
 Discovery Circumstances: Numbered Minor Planets (5001)-(10000) – Minor Planet Center
 
 

007545
Discoveries by Claes-Ingvar Lagerkvist
Named minor planets
19780728